Vaalimaa is a village in the Virolahti municipality and a border crossing point between Finland and Russia. The border crossing station was opened in 1958 as a first road traffic crossing point between Finland and Soviet Union. With over 2 million annual crossings, it is the busiest border crossing in the Finnish-Russian border, which is also the border of the European Union and Russia. European route E18 passes through Vaalimaa.

The border crossing is notorious for its long queues. Around Christmas 2007 there could even be a 50 to 60 kilometer line of trucks. The functioning of the border crossing is affected by the actions of the Russian Customs, Russian Border Control and some other Russian bureaus in Torfyanovka.

Trucks and passenger cars are handled in different lines. In 2004 it became possible to cross the border by bicycle. Pedestrian crossing is still forbidden.

Distances from Vaalimaa
Helsinki: 
Kotka: 
Saint Petersburg: 
Vyborg:

Sources

External links
 Vaalimaa
 Vaalimaa webcams – Finnish Road Administration website
 Finnish border crossing points - Finnish Border Guard

Villages in Finland
Finland–Russia border crossings